The International School of Toulouse is a private, international day school for boys and girls aged 3 to 18.

It was founded in 1999 by Airbus Mobility, a wholly owned subsidiary of Airbus SAS, with the aim to facilitate the global mobility of the company's workforce. The school also admits students whose parents are not sponsored by the Airbus Mobility program, subject to the payment of an annual tuition fee. 

It is located in Colomiers, near Toulouse, in the Haute Garonne department of France.

History
The school was founded in 1999 after the aeronautics industry in nearby Blagnac expanded. The school is sponsored by Airbus, with the aim of facilitating the mobility of their employees from all over the world.

Tuition and Fees
Although the school is intended principally to serve the educational needs of children of sponsored Airbus employees who transfer to Toulouse, other children may be accepted to the school on a tuition-paying basis, subject to available space and evaluation of their suitability.

Their fees can be found here: https://www.intst.eu/copy-of-admissions-process

Controversy
On 23 December 2006, Richard Jones-Nerzic, a former teacher at IST was dismissed. This decision raised concern that it had been taken to remove a union representative from the staff, since some other SUNDEP members were previously dismissed. His dismissal from the IST, in connection with the dismissal of another teacher, sparked adverse comment from teachers, students, ex-students and parents. In January 2010, Richard Jones-Nerzic became the fourth teacher to win a case for unfair dismissal against the school.

References

External links
Website of the Head of History at the International School of Toulouse
ICT at the International School of Toulouse
Website for The International School of Toulouse Student Lead Environment Group

British international schools in France
Educational institutions established in 1999
International Baccalaureate schools in France
1999 establishments in France
Lycées in Haute-Garonne
Education in Toulouse